The 1989 Milan–San Remo was the 80th edition of the Milan–San Remo cycle race and was held on 18 March 1989. The race started in Milan and finished in San Remo. The race was won by Laurent Fignon of the Système U team.

General classification

References

1989
March 1989 sports events in Europe
1989 in road cycling
1989 in Italian sport
1989 UCI Road World Cup